Robin Aircraft is a French manufacturer of light aircraft. It succeeds to Centre-Est Aéronautique, Avions Pierre Robin and Apex Aircraft (Avions Robin and Robin Aviation).

History

Centre-Est Aéronautique was formed by Pierre Robin and Jean Délémontez, the principal designer of Jodel aircraft, in October 1957. It began manufacturing aircraft at Darois, near Dijon, France.

The first aircraft was designed by Robin and Délémontez. It was based on the D10, a four-seater designed by Édouard Joly and Délémontez at Jodel, that was shelved when work on the Jodel D11 became more urgent. In collaboration with Robin it became the 'Jodel Robin'. It later became the DR100 model (Jodel's models all had D followed by a number). Robin and Délémontez continued to upgrade the design between 1957 and 1972.

The DR100 range was succeeded by the DR200 range. Production continued in November 1970 under the name Avions Pierre Robin.

The Robin DR400 first flew in 1972 and is still in production. It has a tricycle undercarriage and can carry 4 people.  The DR aircraft have the 'cranked wing' configuration, in which the dihedral angle of the outer wing is much greater than the inboard, a configuration which they share with Jodel aircraft. The best known today is the popular DR400, which is a wooden sport monoplane, conceived by Pierre Robin and Jean Délémontez.

The Robin HR200 had a different designer, Chris Heintz, and is fully metallic unlike the wooden DR series.  It is a light aerobatic aircraft aimed at flight training.  The Robin R2000 series was developed from the HR200 and is produced as the Alpha 2000 by Alpha Aviation in Hamilton, New Zealand, since 2004.

Avions Pierre Robin was acquired by Apex Aircraft of France in 1988. Aircraft continued to be manufactured at Darois under the names Avions Robin and Robin Aviation.

By 2008, about half of the production were fitted with diesel engines supplied by Thielert. Thielert went into liquidation because of alleged fraud, cutting off the engine supply to Apex Aircraft. Thielert were taken over by a receiver, and the price of engines and parts was increased. This pushed the price of finished aircraft too high for the market to bear, with the result that Apex Aircraft went into liquidation in 2008. CEAPR, based in the same premises at Darois and responsible for making the components for Apex Aircraft, continued to supply parts.

Aircraft manufacturing resumed in 2012 under the name Robin Aircraft. (All type certificates are held by CEAPR.)

The company offers the DR401 aircraft, a DR400 upgraded with a glass cockpit, larger cockpit, electric trim and flaps, and available with several engine options.

The company also offers the aerobatic aircraft CAP 10C NG, an updated version of the Mudry CAP 10. The type certificate was transferred to CEAPR in 2015, and the first aircraft was delivered in 2021.

Aircraft

The new DR401, with a wider cabin and electric flaps and trim, was introduced at AERO Friedrichshafen on 9 April 2014.

 Robin ATL
 CAP 10C NG
 Robin DR100
 Robin DR200
 Robin DR300
 Robin DR400
 Robin HR100
 Robin HR200
 Robin R1000
 Robin R2000
 Robin R3000
 Robin X4

References

Citations

Bibliography

External links
 
 Alpha Aviation
 PilotFriend.com's page about Robin with sub-pages about each aircraft.

Aircraft manufacturers of France
Companies based in Bourgogne-Franche-Comté